For other uses, see Issue.

Issue (이슈) is a South Korean magazine published by Daiwon C.I. Its first issue was published in 1995, and it is currently released on the 25th day of each month. It specializes in serialization of domestic and imported comics. Individual titles are collected into volumes and published under the Issue Comics imprint. Light novels imported from Japan are also translated and published under the name Issue Novels.

Serializations

The following is a list of titles currently serialized in Issue and/or published under the Issue Comics book imprint. Some series are updated infrequently and as such do not appear in every issue of the magazine.

References

External links
 Issue @ Daiwon C.I.

1995 establishments in South Korea
Magazines established in 1995
Magazines published in South Korea
Manhwa magazines
Mass media in Seoul
Monthly magazines